Huntington State Park is a protected area of Utah, United States, featuring a warm-water reservoir.  The state park is located near the town of Huntington.

Description
Huntington Reservoir was completed in 1966 by the United States Bureau of Reclamation as part of an Emery County irrigation and recreation project. This warm-water reservoir supports waterskiing, fishing, and crawdad catching. Largemouth bass and bluegill are the most noteworthy fish in this warm-water lake. Many migratory birds, specifically waterfowl, are sighted in this area.

The town of Huntington was founded in 1877. The name of both the town and reservoir honors the three Huntington brothers, Oliver, William, and Dimick, who first explored this area in 1855. Dimick was an interpreter for the local Indians; William was famed as a scout and explorer; and Oliver was an official recorder for the unsuccessful Elk Mountain Mission to Moab.

See also

 List of Utah State Parks

References

External links

 

Protected areas of Emery County, Utah
Protected areas established in 1966
State parks of Utah